Kenneth Dember is a West Indian cricketer. He made his first-class debut for the Windward Islands in the 2017–18 Regional Four Day Competition on 30 November 2017. He made his List A debut on 13 February 2021, for the Windward Islands, in the 2020–21 Super50 Cup.

References

External links
 

Year of birth missing (living people)
Living people
Windward Islands cricketers
Place of birth missing (living people)